Shanvey is a small village and townland in County Londonderry, Northern Ireland. It lies about 6 km north of Limavady on Aghanloo Road, the A2 coastal route between Limavady and Coleraine. It is designated as a hamlet and is situated within Causeway Coast and Glens district and in the North Londonderry Area of Outstanding Natural Beauty.

See also 
List of villages in Northern Ireland

References

Villages in County Londonderry
Townlands of County Londonderry
Causeway Coast and Glens district